Claudio Silva da Fonseca (born 3 November 1979 in Rio de Janeiro, Brazil), better known as Carioca, is a Brazilian former professional footballer who played as a midfielder.

See also
List of football clubs in Brazil

References
 

1979 births
Living people
Brazilian footballers
Footballers from Rio de Janeiro (city)
Association football midfielders
CR Vasco da Gama players
Fluminense FC players
Clube Atlético Bragantino players
Sport Club Corinthians Paulista players
Associação Desportiva São Caetano players
Deportivo Táchira F.C. players
America Football Club (RJ) players
Coquimbo Unido footballers
Unión La Calera footballers
Rangers de Talca footballers
Brazilian expatriate footballers
Brazilian expatriate sportspeople in Chile
Expatriate footballers in Chile
Brazilian expatriate sportspeople in Portugal
Expatriate footballers in Portugal
Brazilian expatriate sportspeople in Venezuela
Expatriate footballers in Venezuela